"Cool Patrol" is a song by American musical comedy duo Ninja Sex Party. It was released as a single along with a music video on October 18, 2016, and is the first single from their sixth studio album, released on August 17, 2018.

Written by band members Dan Avidan and Brian Wecht, the song tells the story of Danny Sexbang and Ninja Brian, who, calling themselves the "Cool Patrol", help a bullied high-schooler become tougher and cooler. It is the band's first release with producer Jim Roach, and their first original song to feature TWRP as backup band. The music video features YouTube personality Jacksepticeye as the bullied kid; he also provides minor spoken parts in the song.

The song reached #1 on the iTunes Comedy chart.

Production 
The song was released as a single on October 18, 2016, almost two years before the release of the eponymous album.

Music video 
The music video was filmed in June 2016 and released on October 18, 2016 along with the single. It was originally announced five days earlier on October 13. It was directed and edited by regular NSP music video director Sean Barrett, with Svetlana Dekic as producer, and Gordon Yould as director of photography.

YouTube personality Jacksepticeye portrays "The Kid" central to the video, with Markiplier and Supermega as the other members of the "Cool Patrol". It also features minor appearances by former Game Grumps editor Barry Kramer and Pamela Horton.

Reception 
The song reached #1 on the iTunes Comedy chart, and the music video reached a million views on YouTube in its first week.

Personnel
Ninja Sex Party
Dan Avidan – lead and backing vocals
Brian Wecht – keyboards, piano, synthesizer

 Production and additional musicians
 TWRP – backup band
 Lord Phobos – guitar
 Commander Meouch – bass guitar
 Doctor Sung – keytar, synthesizer, keyboards
 Havve Hogan – drums
 Jim Roach – production, engineer
 Jacksepticeye – spoken vocals

References

2016 songs
2016 singles
Comedy songs
Ninja Sex Party songs